The surname An is a Chinese Surname which literally means "peace" or "tranquility". It also serves as an abbreviation of Anxi (安息), meaning "Arsacid" in Chinese and can be romanized as On. Visitors to China who came from Arsacid-held territories often took the name An. In 2008, it was the 110th most common surname in the People's Republic of China, shared by over 1.7 million citizens. The surname is most common in Northern China. It is the 79th name on the Hundred Family Surnames poem.

During the Song Dynasty, another An (俺) was a Jewish Chinese surname.

Origins of An (安)

Iranian

Parthian

During the Qin and Han Dynasty, the most common origin of the surname An was as a contraction of Anxi, meaning "Arsacid", and was thus given to people of Arsacid-territory origin, such as An Shigao, a nobleman from the Arsacid Empire. An Xuan, another Parthian, followed An Shigao to Luoyang and assisted in his translations of Buddhist texts.

During the 3rd Century, An Faqin (安法欽), a Parthian Buddhist from the Parthian Empire, came to Xijin (西晉).

Sogdian 
In the Tang Dynasty period 9th century, An was also sometimes used as the name for the region of Sogdia; previously, Sogdians had exclusively used the surname of Kang (康). The addition was due to the existence of two Sogdian kingdoms, identified as An and Kangju; the state of An was accordingly named due to its occupation by the Arsacids. It is considered one of the "Nine Sogdian Surnames."

Xueyantuo
During the Northern Wei period in the 6th century, Anchi/Anzhi (安迟) was the Xianbei surname of Uyghur people (回鶻人) a division of the Hui people; they later reduced the surname to An (安). During the Tang Dynasty in the 8th century, the An (安) family name was used among the Xueyantuo (薛延陀) people.

Khitan
During the Qing Dynasty, Ardan (阿爾丹) the Daur people (達斡爾族) were given the surname An (安) with the Ar dialect.

Notable people

Historical figures
An Shigao (安世高), the first Buddhist missionary to China and a former Parthian prince
An Xuan, who followed An Shigao to Luoyang several decades later
An Faqin (安法欽), Parthian Buddhist in Xijin (西晉) the Chinese state
An Lushan (安祿山), Sogdian-born provincial military governor during the Tang Dynasty
An Chongzhang (安重璋), Sogdian general and Duke of Liang during the Tang Dynasty who had his name changed to Li Baoyu amid the An Lushan Rebellion (to distance himself and his family from the notoriety of the rebel An Lushan)
An Yanyan (安延偃), adoptive father of An Lushan, Iranian origin, rumoured to have been surnamed Kang originally
An Qingxu, son of An Lushan
An Chonghui (安重誨), a minister of Later Tang
An Congjin (安從進), a general of Later Tang and Later Jin (Five Dynasties)
An Chongrong (安重榮), a general of the Later Jin (Five Dynasties)

Modern
 An Qi (安琦; born 1981), Chinese football goalkeeper
 An Yuexi (安悦溪; born 1989), Chinese actress
 Shone An, Taiwanese singer, actor and television host

Stage name
 Amber An (安心亞; born Liao Ching-ling (Chinese: 廖婧伶; pinyin: Liào Jìnglíng),[1] Taiwanese actress, singer, television host, and model
 Ady An Yi-xuan (安以軒; born 吳玟靜 on 1980), Taiwanese actress and singer

See also

Ant (name)

References

Chinese-language surnames
China–Iran relations